Escuela Deportiva Municipal de Fútbol Churra is a Spanish football team based in Churra, in the Region of Murcia. Founded in 2009, it plays in Tercera División – Group 13, holding home matches at Campo Municipal de Churra.

Season to season

5 seasons in Tercera División

References

External links
La Preferente team profile 
Soccerway team profile

Football clubs in the Region of Murcia
Sports teams in the Region of Murcia
Association football clubs established in 2009
2009 establishments in Spain